Kyle Antonio Hope (born 20 November 1988) is a Barbadian cricketer who has played for both Barbados and Trinidad and Tobago in West Indian domestic cricket, as well as the Combined Campuses and Colleges. He is a right-handed middle-order batsman.

Career
Hope was born in Saint Michael Parish, and attended Queen's College and The Lodge School. He made his first-class debut for Barbados during the 2009–10 Regional Four Day Competition, and made semi-regular appearances over the following three seasons. After a period of poor form, Hope was left without a team for the 2013–14 season, although the following year he appeared for the Combined Campuses in the 2014–15 Regional Super50. He had earlier played for the team in the 2011 and 2012 Caribbean Twenty20 tournaments. For the 2015–16 season, Hope switched to Trinidad and Tobago, returning to first-class cricket for the first time since February 2013. His younger brother, Shai Hope, is also a professional cricketer, and has played international cricket for the West Indies.

In June 2017, he was added to the West Indies One Day International (ODI) squad, ahead of the third match against India. He made his ODI debut for the West Indies against India on 30 June 2017. The following month, he was named in the West Indies squad for the Test series against England. He made his Test debut in the first match of the series on 17 August 2017.

In November 2019, he was named in Trinidad and Tobago's squad for the 2019–20 Regional Super50 tournament. In June 2020, he was selected by Barbados, in the players' draft hosted by Cricket West Indies ahead of the 2020–21 domestic season.

References

External links

1988 births
Living people
West Indies Test cricketers
West Indies One Day International cricketers
Barbadian cricketers
Barbados cricketers
Combined Campuses and Colleges cricketers
People from Saint Michael, Barbados
Barbados Royals cricketers
Trinidad and Tobago cricketers